Steffen Olai Steffensen (1842 – ??) was a Norwegian politician for the Conservative Party.

He was elected to the Parliament of Norway in 1897, representing the constituency of Akershus Amt. He was a farmer. He sat through one term.

References

1842 births
Year of death missing
Norwegian farmers
Members of the Storting
Akershus politicians
Conservative Party (Norway) politicians